Tate Creek may refer to:

Tate Creek (Chestatee River), a stream in Georgia
Tate Creek (Kentucky), a stream in Kentucky